The 1955 South Pacific Championship for racing cars was a motor race staged at the Gnoo Blas Motor Racing Circuit at Orange in New South Wales, Australia on 31 January 1955. The race, which was a Formula Libre event open to racing cars and stripped sports cars, was contested as a scratch race which also incorporated a handicap award. It was held over 27 laps of the 3¾ mile circuit for a total distance of 100 miles. The race, which was the first South Pacific Championship for racing cars, was won by Englishman Peter Whitehead driving a 3 litre Ferrari.

The championship meeting, which was conducted by the Australian Sporting Car Club, was the first FIA sanctioned international race meeting to be staged in Australia.

Race results

Handicap results

Notes:
 Attendance: 30,000
 Number of starters: unknown
 Number of finishers: unknown
 Winner's race time: 65 minutes 1 second
 Winner's average speed: 95 mph
 Fastest lap: Peter Whitehead, Ferrari 500, 2 minutes 21 seconds
 Prince Bira did not start after his Maserati suffered an engine failure during practice.

References

South Pacific Championship for racing cars
Motorsport at Gnoo Blas